Now That's What I Call Music! 7 was released on July 31, 2001. The album is the seventh edition of the (U.S.) Now! series.  It debuted at number one on the Billboard 200 albums chart, selling 621,000 copies in its first week, the highest opening week of sales for any U.S. Now! album to date. It is the third number-one album in the series and has been certified 3× Platinum by the RIAA. Now! 7 is the first in the series to also crossover onto the Billboard Top R&B/Hip-Hop Albums chart, peaking at number three.

The album features one track, "All for You", that reached number one on the Billboard Hot 100.

Track listing

Charts

Weekly charts

Year-end charts

See also
 List of Billboard 200 number-one albums of 2001

References

2001 compilation albums
 007
Hip hop compilation albums
Virgin Records compilation albums